Puchenii Mari is a commune in Prahova County, Muntenia, Romania. It is composed of seven villages: Miroslăvești, Moara, Odăile, Pietroșani, Puchenii Mari, Puchenii Mici and Puchenii-Moșneni.

Natives
 Simion Stolnicu
 Florea Voinea

References

Communes in Prahova County
Localities in Muntenia